Arvind Krishna Mehrotra (born 1947) is an Indian poet, anthologist, literary critic and translator.

Biography 
Arvind Krishna Mehrotra was born in Lahore in 1947. He has published six collections of poetry in English and two of translation — a volume of Prakrit love poems, The Absent Traveller, recently reissued in Penguin Classics, and Songs of Kabir (NYRB Classics). His Oxford India Anthology of Twelve Modern Indian Poets (1992) has been very influential. He has edited several books, including History of Indian Literature in English (Columbia University Press, 2003) and Collected Poems in English by Arun Kolatkar (Bloodaxe Books, 2010). His collection of essays Partial Recall: Essays on Literature and Literary History was published by Permanent Black in 2012. A second book of essays, Translating the Indian Past (Permanent Black), appeared in 2019.

Mehrotra  was nominated for the post of Professor of Poetry at the University of Oxford in 2009. He came second behind Ruth Padel, who later resigned over allegations of a smear campaign against Trinidadian poet Derek Walcott (who had himself earlier withdrawn from the election process).

Mehrotra has translated more than 200 literary works from ancient Prakrit language, and from Hindi, Bengali and Gujarati.

Bibliography

Poetry collections 
Mehrotra, A. K. (1984). Middle earth. Three Crowns Books. Delhi: Oxford University Press.
Mehrotra, A. K. (1976). Nine enclosures. Bombay: Clearing House.
Mehrotra, A. K. (1982). Distance in statute miles. Bombay: Clearing House.
Mehrotra, A K. (1998). The transfiguring places: poems. Delhi: Ravi Dayal Publisher.
Mehrotra, A. K. (2014). Collected Poems 1969-2014. Delhi: Penguin India.
Mehrotra, A. K. (2016). Collected Poems. Artarmon NSW: Giramondo.
Mehrotra, A.K.  (2020)  Selected Poems and Translations/NYRB Poets. New York: New York Review Books.

Edited books 

Mehrotra, A. K. (2003). History of Indian literature in English. New York: Columbia University Press.
Mehrotra, A. K. (1992). The Oxford India anthology of twelve modern Indian poets. Delhi: Oxford University Press. excerpts
Translated into German as Mehrotra, A. K. (2006). Indische Dichter der Gegenwart eine Anthologie englischsprachiger Lyrik Indiens. Heidelberg: Verl. Das Wunderhorn.
Weissbort, D., & Mehrotra, A. K. (1993). Periplus: poetry in translation. Delhi: Oxford University Press.
Mehrotra, A. K. (2007). The last bungalow: writings on Allahabad. New Delhi: Penguin Books.

Translation 

Mehrotra, A. K. (1991). The Absent Traveller: Prākrit love poetry from the Gāthāsaptaśatī of Sātavāhana Hāla. Delhi: Ravi Dayal Publisher.
Mehrotra, A. K. (2011). Songs of Kabir. New York: NYRB Classics.
Mehrotra, A.K. with Sara Rai (2019). Blue Is Like Blue: Stories by Vinod Kumar Shukla. Delhi: HarperCollins.

Editor of literary magazines 
 damn you/a magazine of the arts. Allahabad, India: 1964-1968.
Ezra. Bombay, India: Ezra-Fakir Press, 1966-1969.
Fakir. Bombay, India: Ezra-Fakir Press, 1966.

See also

Indian English Poetry
Indian poetry in English
Indian English Literature
Indian literature
List of Indian poets

References

External links
 Poetry Centre, Smith College 
 Poems and Bio at Poetry International Web
 Interview with Bharat Iyer An Interview with Arvind Krishna Mehrotra—by Bharat Iyer—Eclectica Magazine v16n2
 Poetry Archive Arvind Krishna Mehrotra
 Guide to the Arvind Krishna Mehrotra Papers 1960-2014 Guide to the Arvind Krishna Mehrotra papers, 1960-2014.

Further reading
Among the published works giving an analysis of his poetry are:
Lakshmi Raghunandan. (1990). Contemporary Indian poetry in English: with special emphasis on Nissim Ezekiel, Kamala Das, R. Parthasarathy, and A.K. Ramanujan : other poets assessed are Arun Kolatkar, Shiv K. Kumar, Keki N. Daruwalla, Jayanta Mahapatra, and Arvind Krishna Mehrotra. New Delhi: Reliance Pub. House.

Bruce King, (1987, revised edition 2001) Modern Indian Poetry in English. Delhi: Oxford University Press.

He is interviewed in the following works:
De Souza, E. (1999). Talking poems: conversations with poets. Delhi: Oxford University Press.

Reviews

External links
Arvind Krishna Mehrotra at the Poetry Archive
Arvind Krishna Mehrotra at Poetry International

1947 births
English-language poets from India
Living people
21st-century Indian poets
Indian male poets
International Writing Program alumni
21st-century Indian male writers
Translators from Bengali
20th-century Indian translators
21st-century Indian translators
Translators from Gujarati
Translators from Hindi
20th-century Indian poets